13th AFCA Awards

Best Film: 
Get Out

The 13th Austin Film Critics Association Awards, honoring the best in filmmaking for 2017, were announced on January 8, 2018.

Winners and nominees

References

External links
 Official website

2017 film awards
2017
2017 in Texas